The 314th Operations Group (314 OG) is the flying component of the Air Education and Training Command 314th Airlift Wing, stationed at Little Rock Air Force Base, Arkansas.

Overview
The group provides C-130 initial and tactical aircrew training in all crew positions for all of the Department of Defense and allied students from 46 nations.

Units
The 314th Operations Group is composed of one flying squadron and one training squadron.

 The 62nd Airlift Squadron flies the C-130J Super Hercules
 The 714th Training Squadron provided administrative support for all students

History
 See the 314th Airlift Wing for additional history and lineage

World War II
During World War II the 314th Troop Carrier Group arrived in the Mediterranean Theater of Operations in May 1943, taking part with Twelfth Air Force units in two airborne operations. It flew two major night missions in July 1943 during the Sicily invasion, dropping paratroops of 82d Airborne Division near Gela on 9 July and reinforcements to the area on the 11th.

Later in the year, the group transported paratroops and supplies to Salerno, 14 and 15 September, during the invasion of Italy. Squadrons from the 314th flew additional missions in the Mediterranean before it transferred, in February 1944, to England for further training.

From England, it took part with the Ninth Air Force in the Normandy invasion, flying numerous supply and reinforcement missions in the ensuing period. The 314th dropped paratroops over the Netherlands in September and carried munitions and supplies to the same area. After moving to France in late February 1945, it participated in the airborne crossings of the Rhine River near Wesel on 24 March. The group then brought supplies and equipment to combat units and airlifted wounded U.S. and Allied personnel to rear-area hospitals.

After the termination of hostilities, it evacuated prisoners of war from German camps and flew regular personnel and freight service. It transferred without personnel or equipment (WOPE) to the United States in February 1946, and in September again transferred WOPE, to the Panama Canal Zone, where the 314th operated air terminals under Caribbean Air Command. It moved back to the United States in October 1948 for further training.

Cold War

Transferring without personnel or equipment (WOPE) to US in February 1946, and in Sep, again WOPE, to the Canal Zone, the 314th operated air terminals under Caribbean Air Command. It moved back to the US in October 1948 for further training.

The group served in Japan during the Korean War, participating in two major airborne operations, at Sunchon in October 1950 and at Munsan-ni in March 1951. It later transported supplies to Korea and evacuated prisoners of war. In 1954, it again transferred, without personnel or equipment to the US where it participated in a continuous stream of tactical exercises and inspections until October 1957.

Modern era

The group flew worldwide airlift and provided all C-130 aircrew training to U.S. and allied aircrews, September 1978 – June 1980 and from December 1991 to present.

Lineage
 Established as the 314th Transport Group on 28 January 1942
 Activated on 2 March 1942
 Redesignated: 314th Troop Carrier Group on 4 July 1942
 Redesignated: 314th Troop Carrier Group, Heavy on 26 July 1948
 Redesignated: 314th Troop Carrier Group, Medium on 19 November 1948
 Inactivated on 8 October 1957
 Redesignated 314th Tactical Airlift Group on 24 August 1978
 Activated on 15 September 1978
 Inactivated on 15 June 1980
 Redesignated 314th Operations Group and activated on 1 December 1991

Assignments

 50th Transport Wing, 2 March 1942
 52d Transport Wing, 15 June 1942
 53d Troop Carrier Wing, 30 August 1942
 50th Troop Carrier Wing, 3 November 1942
 52d Troop Carrier Wing, 20 February 1943
 IX Air Force Service Command, 20 May 1945
 302d Transport Wing, 11 August 1945
 European Air Transport Service (Provisional), 3 September 1945
 United States Air Forces in European Theater, 31 December 1945
 Eighteenth Air Force, 15 February 1946
 Strategic Air Command, 21 March 1946
 Third Air Force, 25 July 1946
 Caribbean Air Command, 9 September 1946

 Panama Air Depot, 10 March 1948
 5700 Wing, Caribbean Air Command, 26 July 1948
 Ninth Air Force, 21 October 1948
 314th Troop Carrier Wing, 1 November 1948 – 8 October 1957
 Attached to Far East Air Forces, 7 September 1950
 Attached to FEAF Combat Cargo Command, 10 September 1950
 Attached to 314th Air Division, 1 December 1950
 Attached to 315th Air Division, 25 January 1951 – c. 1 November 1952
 Attached to 483d Troop Carrier Wing, 1 January 1953 – 15 November 1954
 314th Tactical Airlift Wing, 15 September 1978 – 15 June 1980
 314th Airlift Wing, 1 December 1991 – present

Components
 16th Airlift Squadron: 1 December 1991 – 1 October 1993
 20th Troop Carrier Squadron: 17 June 1948 – 20 October 1949
 30th Transport Squadron: 2 March – 14 June 1942
 31st Transport Squadron: 2 March – 16 June 1942
 32d Transport (later, 32d Troop Carrier; 32d Tactical Airlift) Squadron (S2): 2 March 1942 – 18 September 1945; 1 November 1978 – 30 June 1979
 34th Combat Airlift Training Squadron (later, Combat Aerial Delivery School; USAF Combat Aerial Delivery School): 1 December 1991–present
 45th Airlift Squadron: 1 October 1999 – 15 July 2011
 48th Airlift Squadron: 1 December 2003 – present
 50th Troop Carrier (later, 50th Tactical Airlift; 50th Airlift) Squadron (2R): 15 June 1942 – 27 May 1946; 17 October 1949 – 8 October 1957; 1 November 1978 – 15 June 1980; 1 December 1991 – 1 April 1997
 53d Airlift Squadron: 1 October 1993 – 11 January 2008
 61st Troop Carrier (later, 61st Tactical Airlift; 61st Airlift) Squadron (Q9): attached, 26 October 1942, assigned 15 March 1942-c. December 1945 (detached October–December 1945); assigned 17 October 1949 – 8 October 1957 (detached 1 October 1951-c. 1 November 1954); assigned 1 November 1978 – 15 June 1980; 1 December 1991 – 1 April 1997
 62d Troop Carrier (later, 62d Tactical Airlift, 62d Airlift) Squadron (E5): 15 March 1943-c. October 1946; 6 December 1945 – 15 February 1946; 17 October 1949 – 8 October 1957; 1 December 1991–present
 301st Troop Carrier Squadron: attached 15 February – 27 May 1946
 302d Troop Carrier Squadron: 15 May – 7 August 1945; 15 October 1945 – 27 May 1946
 321st Troop Carrier Squadron: attached 16 October 1945 – 5 December 1945; assigned 6 December 1945 – 27 August 1946; 8 June 1955 – 1 August 1957
 323d Troop Carrier Squadron: 16 October 1945 – 30 September 1946
 334th Troop Carrier Squadron: 15 October 1946 – 20 October 1949.

Stations

 Drew Field, Florida, 1 March 1942
 Bowman Field, Kentucky, 24 June 1942
 Sedalia Army Air Field, Missouri, 4 November 1942
 Lawson Field, Georgia, 19 February-4 May 1943
 Berguent Airfield, French Morocco, 20 May 1943
 Kairouan Airfield, Tunisia, 26 June 1943
 Castelvetrano Airfield, Sicily, 1 September 1943 – 13 February 1944
 RAF Saltby (Station 538), England, 20 February 1944 – 28 February 1945
 Poix Airfield (B-44), France, 4 March 1945
 Villacoublay Airfield (Station 180, A-42), France, 15 October 1945 – 15 February 1946

 Bolling Field, District of Columbia, 15 February-9 September 1946
 Albrook Field, Panama Canal Zone, 9 September 1946
 Curundu Heights, Panama Canal Zone, 10 March–October 1948
 Smyrna Air Force Base (later Sewart Air Force Base, Tennessee, 21 October 1948
 Laurinburg-Maxton Airport, North Carolina, 19 April 1950
 Sewart Air Force Base, Tennessee, 5 May-1 September 1950
 Ashiya Air Base, Japan, 7 September 1950 – 15 November 1954
 Sewart Air Force Base, Tennessee, 15 November 1954 – 8 October 1957
 Little Rock Air Force Base, Arkansas, 15 September 1978 – 15 June 1980
 Little Rock Air Force Base, Arkansas, 1 December 1991–present

Aircraft assigned
 Douglas C-47 Skytrain, 1942–1946
 Douglas C-53 Skytrooper, 1942–1943
 Douglas C-54 Skymaster, 1947–1948
 Fairchild C-82 Packet, 1949–1950
 Fairchild C-119 Flying Boxcar, 1950–1957
 Lockheed C-130 Hercules, 1978–1980; 1991–present
 Learjet C-21, 1999–2011

See also

References

Bibliography

 
 
 
 
 
 Air Force Instruction 84-105, Organizational Lineage, Honors and Heraldry, 19 March 2013

External links

Operations groups of the United States Air Force